Herb Hudson (28 May 1880 – 9 July 1935) was an  Australian rules footballer who played with St Kilda in the Victorian Football League (VFL).

References

External links 

1880 births
1935 deaths
Australian rules footballers from Victoria (Australia)
St Kilda Football Club players